Qebleh Bolaghi (also Romanized as Qebleh Bolāghī; also known as Kiblag-Bulag, Qebleh Būlāgh, and Qiblahbulāq) is a village in Qareh Poshtelu-e Pain Rural District, Qareh Poshtelu District, Zanjan County, Zanjan Province, Iran. At the 2006 census, its population was 266, in 45 families.

References 

Populated places in Zanjan County